The Esiliiga B Player of the Year is an annual award given to the best Esiliiga B player for his performances in the league.

Winners

See also
Esiliiga B

References

External links
Official website 

 
Estonia 3B
Lists of Estonian sportspeople
Estonian sports trophies and awards
Association football player non-biographical articles